Mohiyuddin Nadukkandiyil Karassery, commonly known as M. N. Karassery, is an Indian writer and critic of Malayalam language. He is known for his writing and lectures on politics, literature, art and culture, and is a recipient of K.M. Seethi Sahib Memorial Human Fraternity Award and holds the distinguished chair in Malayalam studies at University of Calicut.

Early life
Karassery is also the name of the village in which he was born. It is a panchayath situated in the eastern region of Kozhikode (Calicut) District in Kerala. Mr. Karassery was born on July 2, 1951 to N. C. Mohammad Haji and K. C. Ayishakkutty.

Education
For his early education, Karassery attended the Karassery U.P. School, Hidayathussibiyan Madrasa and Dars of Karassery Juma Masjid. He then enrolled in the Chennamangallur High School, Guruvayurappan College, Calicut. After graduation in 1972, he joined the Department of Malayalam, at the University of Calicut. Here he earned a B.A. in Sociology and Malayalam in 1974. Ten years later, he returned for a M.Phil in Malayalam. And in 1993, he earned a Ph.D in Malayalam from the same department under the guidance of Prof. Sukumar Azhicode.

Activism and public life
Karassery's activism targets caste prejudice, social justice and religious equality in India. In May 2017, for example, he suggested the creation of a separate department in India for happiness. His writings and lectures support secular democracy and gender justice. In September 2018, he led a sit-in protest that demanded the arrest of bishop Franco Mulakkal for allegedly raping a nun.

Bibliography
Karassery's works include:

Edited works

Interviews

Translations

Awards
 N. Mohanan Award
 Sambasivan Award

References

External links
 Personal page
 University page
 40th Anniversary of the Department of Malayalam, Calicut University
 Excerpts from Karassery's book Islamika Rashtreeyam Vimarshikkapedunnu

Activists from Kerala
Living people
Malayalam-language writers
People from Kozhikode district
1951 births
Malayalam literary critics
Indian literary critics